Sylvania is a town in and the county seat of Screven County, Georgia, United States. The population was 2,956 at the 2010 census.

History
The area was inhabited for thousands of years by various cultures of indigenous peoples. By the time of European encounter, it was occupied by the Yuchi peoples, but some Creeks, the Uchee's allies, moved into the area during Colonial times.

The town of Sylvania was founded in 1790 by settlers migrating to the area after the American Revolutionary War. The word "Sylvania" comes from the Latin word sylvan or sylva  which means "forest land" or "place in the woods."

Sylvania was part of the Black Belt of Georgia, developed for cultivation after the cotton gin made it easier to handle short-fiber cotton. Cotton was the most important commodity crop until late in the 19th century.  Planters imported many enslaved African Americans to cultivate the crops.  By 1830 the county was filled with people. The county seat was moved from Jacksonborough to Sylvania in 1847.

As part of the projects of the Works Progress Administration, federally commissioned murals were produced from 1934 to 1943 in the United States through the Section of Painting and Sculpture, later called the Section of Fine Arts, of the Treasury Department. In 1941, Caroline Speare Rohland painted a mural for the post office of Sylvania. The scene depicted was of a farming family and their African American farm hand. In the 1980s, complaints from the local NAACP chapter resulted in the removal of the mural. It was found in a closet of the post office in 1995 and restored. The mural is now on permanent loan from the federal government and is held by Georgia Southern University in Statesboro.

Sherman's army moved through the area during the Civil War.

Sylvania calls itself the "Azalea and Dogwood City" and the "Welcome Station City."

Geography

U.S. Route 301 and Georgia State Route 21 are the main routes through the city. U.S. 301 runs north-south as a western bypass of the downtown area, leading northeast 29 mi (47 km) to Allendale, South Carolina and southwest 23 mi (37 km) to Statesboro. GA-21 runs along the western bypass of the city concurrent with U.S. 301, leading southeast 34 mi (55 km) to Springfield and west 19 mi (31 km) to Millen. Additionally, Georgia State Route 73 runs through the downtown area upon splitting from U.S. 301 south of downtown, but rejoins that route north of the city.

The city is located roughly halfway between the major cities of Savannah and Augusta.

Sylvania's elevation is 230 feet and is slightly higher than most of the land throughout Screven County.

The city's flora include pine, oak, and most notably, dogwood, thus the slogan "The Dogwood City." Although Spanish moss is not as prevalent as in nearby Savannah, it can still be seen in Sylvania and the surrounding countryside.

Demographics

2020 census

As of the 2020 United States census, there were 2,634 people, 1,092 households, and 672 families residing in the city.

2010 census
As of the 2010 United States Census, there were 2,956 people living in the city. The racial makeup of the city was 50.5% Black, 45.8% White, 0.1% Native American, 1.2% Asian, 0.0% Pacific Islander and 1.0% from two or more races. 1.4% were Hispanic or Latino of any race.

2000 census
As of the census of 2000, there were 2,675 people, 1,088 households, and 683 families living in the city. The racial makeup of the city was 57.42% White, 41.57% African American, 0.11% Native American, 0.34% Asian, 0.34% from other races, and 0.22% from two or more races. Hispanic or Latino of any race were 0.93% of the population.

There were 1,088 households, out of which 26.2% had children under the age of 18 living with them, 40.5% were married couples living together, 19.4% had a female householder with no husband present, and 37.2% were non-families. 34.7% of all households were made up of individuals, and 18.0% had someone living alone who was 65 years of age or older.  The average household size was 2.32 and the average family size was 3.01.

In the city, the population was spread out, with 22.7% under the age of 18, 8.8% from 18 to 24, 22.9% from 25 to 44, 21.5% from 45 to 64, and 24.2% who were 65 years of age or older.  The median age was 42 years. For every 100 females, there were 78.3 males.  For every 100 females age 18 and over, there were 71.6 males.

The median income for a household in the city was $27,426, and the median income for a family was $38,355. Males had a median income of $40,590 versus $20,349 for females. The per capita income for the city was $16,181.  About 13.2% of families and 18.7% of the population were below the poverty line, including 23.3% of those under age 18 and 25.0% of those age 65 or over.

Arts and culture

Annual events
Sylvania hosts an Annual Livestock Festival in April.

Education 
The Screven County School District holds grades pre-school to grade twelve, and consists of one elementary school, a middle school and a high school. The district has 186 full-time teachers and over 3,130 students. William Bland is the superintendent.

Notable people
 William Lovett Anderson, U.S. Navy Rear Admiral and Navy Cross recipient

References

Further reading
 C. Dixon Hollingsworth, The History of Screven County Georgia (Curtis Media, 1989)

External links
 
 City of Sylvania Georgia Portal style website, Government, Business, Library, Recreation and more
 City-Data.com Comprehensive Statistical Data and more about Sylvania

Cities in Georgia (U.S. state)
Cities in Screven County, Georgia
County seats in Georgia (U.S. state)